Land of the Pharaohs is a 1955 American epic historical drama film in Cinemascope and WarnerColor from Warner Brothers, produced and directed by Howard Hawks. The cast was headed by Jack Hawkins as Pharaoh Khufu and Joan Collins as one of his wives, Nellifer. The film is a fictional account of the building of the Great Pyramid. Nobel Prize-winning novelist William Faulkner was one of the film's three credited screenwriters.

Land of the Pharaohs had a cast of thousands – Warners' press office claimed there were 9,787 extras in one scene – and was one of Hollywood's largest-scale, ancient world epics, made in the same spirit as The Robe, The Ten Commandments and Ben-Hur.

Plot
Pharaoh Khufu has amassed a big treasure. He wants to be entombed with it when he dies, free from the threat of grave robbers. He orders Vashtar, a genius architect/slave, to design such a structure. Vashtar agrees, provided his people are freed when his work is done. Years pass. The people of Egypt once thought the building of the pyramid was holy work. Now, they realize it has brought a lifetime of misery and drudgery. Yet Khufu presses on. He levies taxes on outlying provinces to further finance his tomb. The province of Cyprus, however, offers the beautiful Princess Nellifer to the Pharaoh in lieu of taxes. Nellifer eventually becomes one of his wives. She secretly plots to secure Khufu's treasure from being locked in the tomb upon his death.

Meantime, Vashtar's aging eyes begin to fail. He thus reveals the secrets of the tomb to his son, Senta, in order to get his help. One day on the construction site, Senta saves Khufu from a runaway stone block. Promised a reward, Senta chooses Nellifer's slave Kyra. When Nellifer protests, the Pharaoh harshly rebukes her in front of the court. Humiliated, Nellifer conspires to have the Pharaoh meet an early fate. She ultimately manipulates him into a sword fight with the captain of his guard. Though Khufu wins, he is seriously wounded and collapses from blood loss. Nellifer refuses his pleas for help and watches the Pharaoh die. She now believes Khufu's treasure is hers.

Khufu's high priest, Hamar, releases Vashtar and his people. He then orders Khufu's treasure moved to the tomb. Naturally, Nellifer is angered but agrees to preside over the Pharaoh's burial. She believes she will still rule Egypt in her capacity as regent for Khufu's boy/heir. At the funeral, Hamar has Nellifer accompany the body into the tomb's burial chamber. There, she gives the order to seal the sarcophagus. Only then does she realize her own fate - that she, Hamar, and a group of muted priests are trapped by the swiftly moving machinery. "There's no way out!" Hamar tells her. “This is what you lied and schemed and murdered to achieve. This is your kingdom!" At the end, Vashtar and Senta are seen on the way to their homeland. At one point, they pause to look back upon the pyramid.

Cast

 Jack Hawkins as Pharaoh Khufu
 Joan Collins as Princess Nellifer
 Dewey Martin as Senta
 Alexis Minotis as Hamar (dubbed by Robert Rietty)
 James Robertson Justice as Vashtar
 Luisella Boni as Kyra (as Luisa Boni)
 Sydney Chaplin as Treneh
 James Hayter as Mikka
 Kerima as Queen Nailla
 Piero Giagnoni as Prince Xenon
 Carlo D'Angelo as Nabuna (uncredited)

Production

Hawks had between 3,000 and 10,000 extras working each day during the fifty-plus day shooting schedule. The government supplied those extras, half of whom were soldiers in the Egyptian Army.

The film was shot on location in Egypt and in Rome's Titanus studios. For scenes showing the pyramid under construction, the film crew cleared the sand away from a ninety-foot deep shaft that was part of the unfinished pyramid of Baka. Elsewhere, they built a ramp and foundation the size of the original pyramid, where thousands of extras were filmed pulling huge stone blocks. Other scenes were shot at a limestone quarry at Tourah, near Cairo, and at Aswan, a granite quarry located 500 miles away. At these sites, 9,787 actors were filmed for one scene.

The costume designs are the work of French painter and costume designer Mayo, who worked on Les Enfants du paradis (1945) and La Beauté du diable (1950).

When the Pharaoh was inspecting, and rejecting, the Egyptian architects' models for his tomb, the third model he looks at is a model of the actual interior of the pyramid built for Khufu.

Reception
Lacking a big name cast, Land of the Pharaohs was unsuccessful at the box office, earning $450,000 short of its $3,150,000 production budget.

A. H. Weiler of The New York Times wrote that "while it is impressively sweeping in its eye-filling pageantry, this saga of the building of a colossal pyramid 5,000 years ago is staged on the creaky foundation of a tale of palace intrigue that must have been banal even in the First Dynasty." Variety wrote, "While shy of proven draw value in cast names, the Howard Hawks production for Warners makes up for the lack of romance, adventure and intrigue played against a grandioso backdrop of actual story locales populated with teeming masses of thousands upon thousands of extras." Edwin Schallert of the Los Angeles Times wrote: "Hawks has invested his subject with enthralling spectacle from the first victorious march home of the Pharaoh with his captives. The actual story can hardly be designated as having an equally grand concept, and is made exceptional mainly by technical devices." Richard L. Coe of The Washington Post wrote that the technical aspects of the film "will provide moments of complete fascination," but thought that screenwriter "Faulkner, abetted by Harry Kurnitz and Harold Jack Bloom, has laid a Hollywooden egg." Harrison's Reports wrote that the film "grips one's attention throughout," due to the "overwhelming grandeur and vast production values" and "fascinating story." The Monthly Film Bulletin wrote: "The attraction of such epics as Land of the Pharaohs lies almost entirely in their incidental detail, since whatever the period in time, the situation is predictable and the players are doomed to remain within the limitations of Hollywood's historical imagination. It says much for Jack Hawkins' Pharaoh (a performance of integrity and surprising vigour) that it surmounts the occasional absurdities of dress and unlikely figures of speech, even if we remain unconvinced that he is a living god."

The film was banned in Egypt on the grounds of "distortion of historical facts."

Land of the Pharaohs was Howard Hawks's first commercial failure; it caused him to take a break from directing and to travel through Europe for several years. Hawks made his next film, Rio Bravo (1959), four years later; this was the longest break between two feature films in his career.

Cult status
The film has drawn more interest over the years and has been defended by Martin Scorsese, French critics supporting the auteur theory, and for numerous elements of its physical production. Danny Peary in his book Cult Movies (1981), selected it as a cult classic. On Rotten Tomatoes the film holds 75% rating based on 8 reviews.

In a 1978 article Martin Scorsese listed the film as among his favorites
 I'd always been addicted to historical epics, but this one was different: it gave the sense that we were really there. This is the way people lived; this is what they believed, thought, and felt. You get it through the overall look of the picture: the low ceilings, the torchlit interiors, the shape of the pillars, the look of the extras. There's a marvelous moment when the dead are being taken away from battle in their coffins, and someone says, "Let us hear the gods of Egypt speak." The camera pans over to one of the statues of the gods, and it talks. That's it-the statue talks! You don't see the mouth moving, you just hear the voice. Then they pan over to the other god-and now he talks. Soon there are about four gods talking. You're never told, "This is how they did it: it was a joke, a trick." In a sense, you're taken into confidence by the Egyptians; you're let in on a religion. I watch this movie over and over again.

See also
 List of American films of 1955
 List of epic films
 List of historical drama films
 Ancient Egyptian funerary practices

References

External links

 
 
 
 

1955 films
1955 drama films
American drama films
1950s English-language films
American epic films
Films scored by Dimitri Tiomkin
Films directed by Howard Hawks
Films set in ancient Egypt
Warner Bros. films
Films shot in Egypt
Khufu
Fiction set in the 26th century BC
Films set in 2589 BC
Films with screenplays by Harry Kurnitz
Films with screenplays by William Faulkner
CinemaScope films
1950s American films